Brachymyrmex depilis is a species of ant in the family Formicidae.

Taxonomy
The subspecies Brachymyrmex depilis flavescens was described by Grundmann in 1952, however a 2019 study found no significant morphological differences for two different subspecies to be considered. The same study also concluded Brachymyrmex nanellus (Wheeler, 1903) to be a synonym of this species.

Gallery

See also 
 List of Brachymyrmex species

References

Further reading

External links

 

Formicinae
Articles created by Qbugbot
Insects described in 1893